The Iberia Column was a militia column that operated at the beginning of the Spanish Civil War.

History 
The column was created in September 1936, made up of members of the Iberian Anarchist Federation (FAI) of the Levante. It was organized in centuries that acted under the direction of a war committee, which included anarchists such as Vicente Sanchís, Modesto Mameli and José Padilla.  It even came to have its own supply and health services, as well as a field hospital with 72 beds for the wounded. 

The column marched to the Teruel Front, where it remained for most of its existence. Subsequently, it fell under the command of Jesús Velasco Echave, commander of the Torres-Benedito Column.  It did not intervene in the republican offensive on Teruel in December 1936. In the spring of 1937 the column was militarized without opposition from its members,  it was integrated into the 81st Mixed Brigade,  although some of its troops formed the 94th Mixed Brigade.

References

Bibliography 
 
 
 

Defunct anarchist militant groups
Military units and formations of the Spanish Civil War
Confederal militias
Military units and formations established in 1936
Military units and formations disestablished in 1937